CentraCare, Centra Care or Centracare may refer to:

Canada
Centracare (hospital), a psychiatric hospital in New Brunswick

United States
CentraCare Health System, a system of health care providers in Minnesota
Florida Hospital Centra Care, a system of urgent care centers in Florida.